Over the Border is a 1950 American Western film directed by Wallace Fox and written by J. Benton Cheney. The film stars Johnny Mack Brown, Wendy Waldron, Myron Healey, Pierre Watkin, Frank Jaquet and Marshall Reed. The film was released on March 12, 1950, by Monogram Pictures.

Plot

Cast          
Johnny Mack Brown as Johnny Mack Brown
Wendy Waldron as Tess Malloy
Myron Healey as Jeff Grant
Pierre Watkin as Rand Malloy
Frank Jaquet as Dr. Jonathan Foster
Marshall Reed as Bart Calhoun
House Peters Jr. as Wade Shelton
Milburn Morante as Jud Mason
Mike Ragan as Duke Winslow
Hank Bell as Sheriff
George DeNormand as Tucker

References

External links
 

1950 films
American Western (genre) films
1950 Western (genre) films
Monogram Pictures films
Films directed by Wallace Fox
American black-and-white films
1950s English-language films
1950s American films